Richard Ryan may refer to:

Richard Ryan (biographer) (1797–1849), British biographer, poet and playwright of Irish descent 
Richard Ryan (Medal of Honor) (1851–1933), American sailor and Medal of Honor recipient
Richard Ryan (GC) (1903–1940), British Royal Navy officer awarded the George Cross, 1940
Richard Ryan (diplomat) (born 1946), Irish poet and diplomat
Richard Ryan (professor) (born 1953), American professor of psychology
Richard Ryan (politician), politician in Montreal, Quebec, Canada

See also
Richie Ryan (disambiguation)